is a passenger railway station in located in the town of Kushimoto, Higashimuro District, Wakayama Prefecture, Japan, operated by West Japan Railway Company (JR West).

Lines

Station layout
The station consists of one side platform and one island platform connected by a footbridge. The station is unattended.

Platforms

History
Kii-Tahara Station opened on December 11, 1936. With the privatization of the Japan National Railways (JNR) on April 1, 1987, the station came under the aegis of the West Japan Railway Company.

Passenger statistics
In fiscal 2019, the station was used by an average of 14 passengers daily (boarding passengers only).

Surrounding Area
 Kushimoto Town Tahara Elementary School
Konoha Shrine
Tawara beach

See also
List of railway stations in Japan

References

External links

 Kii-Tahara Station (West Japan Railway) 

Railway stations in Wakayama Prefecture
Railway stations in Japan opened in 1936
Kushimoto, Wakayama